Czech Republic participated in the 2010 Summer Youth Olympics in Singapore. It won six individual medals and one gold more in the mixed team event.

Medalists

Archery

Boys

Mixed Team

Athletics

Boys
Track and Road Events

Field Events

Girls
Track and Road Events

Basketball

Girls

Boxing

Boys

Canoeing

Boys

Girls

Cycling

Cross Country

Time Trial

BMX

Road Race

Overall

 * Received −5 for finishing road race with all three racers

Fencing

Group Stage

Knock-Out Stage

Gymnastics

Artistic Gymnastics

Girls

Judo

Individual

Modern pentathlon

Rowing

Shooting

Pistol

Rifle

Swimming

 * qualified due to the withdrawal of another swimmer

Table tennis

Individual

Team

Tennis

Singles

Doubles

Triathlon

Men's

Mixed

References

Competitor List: Czech Republic

Nations at the 2010 Summer Youth Olympics
2010
Summer Youth Olympics